The 1998 Nebraska Cornhuskers football team represented the University of Nebraska–Lincoln in the 1998 NCAA Division I-A football season. The team was coached by Frank Solich and played their home games in Memorial Stadium in Lincoln, Nebraska.

Schedule

Roster and coaching staff

Depth chart

Game summaries

Louisiana Tech

UAB

California

Washington

Oklahoma State

Texas A&M

Kansas

Missouri

Texas

Iowa State

Kansas State

Colorado

Arizona

Rankings

After the season
First-year Head Coach Solich was new to the job title but still in his element, after having served as an assistant in varying capacities with Nebraska since 1975. Solich completed his inaugural season with a final record of 9–4 (5–3), after having lost much of the 1997 national championship team's talent to graduation.  Nonetheless, Nebraska finished tied for 2nd place in the Big 12 North Division, and tied for 4th conference-wide.

The season was concluded by #14 Nebraska falling to #5 Arizona 20–23 at the Holiday Bowl.

Awards

NFL and pro players
The following Nebraska players who participated in the 1998 season later moved on to the next level and joined a professional or semi-pro team as draftees or free agents.

References

Nebraska Cornhuskers
Nebraska Cornhuskers football seasons
Nebraska Cornhuskers football